The men's 20 kilometres walk at the 2010 European Athletics Championships was held on the streets of Barcelona on 27 July.

The race was originally won by Russian race walker Stanislav Emelyanov, who in 2014 was banned due to irregularities in his biological passport, and stripped of the gold medal.

Italian Alex Schwazer was promoted to gold, with fourth-placed Rob Heffernan promoted to the bronze medal position.

Medalists

Records

Schedule

Results

Final

References

 Results

Walk 20 km
Racewalking at the European Athletics Championships